Primauget may refer to one of the following ships of the French Navy named in honour of Hervé de Portzmoguer:

 , a brig
 , a steam corvette
 , a cruiser
 , a transport
 , a 

French Navy ship names